Derrick Martell Rose (born October 4, 1988) is an American professional basketball player for the New York Knicks of the National Basketball Association (NBA). He played one year of college basketball for the Memphis Tigers before being drafted first overall by his hometown Chicago Bulls in the 2008 NBA draft. He was named the NBA Rookie of the Year in 2009 and became the youngest player to win the NBA Most Valuable Player Award in 2011 at age 22.

Rose was born and raised in Chicago, and attended Simeon Career Academy. He was highly recruited by colleges, eventually choosing to join the University of Memphis under coach John Calipari. Rose led the Tigers to the most wins in NCAA history (a 38–2 record), their first number 1 ranking in 25 years, and an appearance in the NCAA championship game. In 2009, an NCAA investigation revealed that Rose's SAT scores had been invalidated, and as a result, the NCAA vacated Memphis' entire 2007–08 season.

Rose has struggled with significant knee injuries since his 2010–11 MVP season. In the first round of the 2012 NBA playoffs against the Philadelphia 76ers, Rose tore his ACL in his left knee. Rose required surgery and was subsequently sidelined for the entire 2012–13 season. Rose returned to play in 2013–14, but in November 2013, Rose injured his right meniscus, causing him to miss the remainder of the season. He returned once again the following season, but knee injuries continued to impact his availability and his production.

In June 2016, Rose was traded to the Knicks, where he finished the final year of his contract. He signed with the Cleveland Cavaliers on a minimum salary for the 2017–18 season but was hobbled by ankle injuries, which led to him being traded to and subsequently waived by the Utah Jazz in February 2018. He signed with the Minnesota Timberwolves a month later on a rest-of-season contract; he stayed with the team through the following season and enjoyed a revived role as a sixth man off the bench despite missing 31 games due to injury management. For the 2019–20 season, the Detroit Pistons signed Rose to his first non-minimum salary contract since 2012, and he continued to be successful off the bench. The following season, he was reunited with his former coach Tom Thibodeau when the Knicks re-acquired him in a trade.

Early life
Rose was born and raised in the Englewood area, one of the most dangerous neighborhoods on Chicago's South Side. He is the youngest son of Brenda Rose after Dwayne, Reggie, and Allan. All three were talented basketball players who taught Rose the ins and outs of basketball on nearby courts. As his talent for the sport grew, Rose began to attract much more outside attention in Chicago's basketball circles, leading his mother and brothers to restrict outside contact to him. She feared he would be exploited and his path to the NBA diverted by outside parties like street agents, similar to what happened to former Chicago prospect Ronnie Fields.

High school career
By the time Rose enrolled at Simeon Career Academy in 2003, he was a hot commodity for collegiate coaches. Despite his reputation, he played freshmen and JV basketball for the Wolverines. He wore No. 25 in honor of Ben "Benji" Wilson, a promising player who was murdered by a gang member during his senior year in 1984. Rose was not allowed on varsity due to a long-standing tradition that head coach Bob Hambric, who had been with the school since 1980 had no freshmen on the varsity team. That rule did not lessen Rose's play, and he went on to put up 18.5 points, 6.6 assists, 4.7 rebounds and 2.1 steals per game and led both the freshmen and sophomores to city championships with a 24–1 record. Hambric softened his stance and allowed the freshman a chance to play on varsity in the state tournament, but Rose declined, wanting the players to get due credit. The next year Hambric retired and Robert Smith was hired, opening the path to varsity. In Rose's debut, he had 22 points, 7 rebounds and 5 steals over Thornwood High School in a sold-out game filled with college scouts and coaches. He led the Wolverines to a 30–5 mark while averaging 19.8 points, 5.1 rebounds, 8.3 assists and 2.4 steals but the season ended after a loss in state regionals. Rose's play garnered him his first national award: a Parade All-American third team spot.

During Rose's junior year in 2006, the Simeon Wolverines broke through and won the Chicago Public League championship held at the United Center, where Rose starred with 25 points and crowd pleasing dunks. The team advanced through the playoffs and earned a berth in the Class AA state championship against Richwoods High School, where a fourth quarter buzzer beater by Richwood forced overtime. The score was knotted at 29 late in the extra period when Rose stole the ball and buried the game winning jumper as time expired, giving Simeon its first state title since the Wilson-led Wolverines won in 1984. The team finished 33–4 and ranked nationally, and Rose was awarded with an All-State Illinois mention, EA Sports All-American Second Team pick and another Parade All-American selection.

Entering his senior year, Rose was ranked the fifth best prospect in the nation by Sports Illustrated. In January 2007, Simeon traveled to Madison Square Garden to play Rice High School and star guard Kemba Walker. The Wolverines lost 53–51. The season's highlight was a nationally televised contest on ESPN against Virginia perennial power Oak Hill Academy two weeks later. Matched up with hyped junior guard Brandon Jennings, Rose had 28 points, 9 assists, and 8 rebounds and in a 78–75 win. For his performance, USA Today named him their high school player of the week. Simeon went on to repeat as Public League champions and defended their state championship, defeating O'Fallon High School 77–54. In doing so, Simeon became the first Chicago Public League school to win two straight state championships. In his final high school game, Rose scored 2 points, but pulled down 7 rebounds and totaled 8 assists, while Simeon big man Tim Flowers scored 35 points. The Wolverines ended the season 33–2 and ranked first in the nation by Sports Illustrated and 6th on USA Today Super 25. Rose averaged 25.2 points, 9.1 assists, 8.8 rebounds and 3.4 steals.

Overall, Simeon's record while Rose played was 120–12. After his senior year, Rose was again All-State after being named Illinois Mr. Basketball and was named to the McDonald's All-American team. He was also awarded with First Team honors by Parade selection and USA Today and USA Today First Team All-American.

Rose was selected to play in the Jordan Brand All-Star Game and Nike Hoop Summit. In 2009, Rose was named the decade's third greatest high school point guard by ESPN RISE magazine behind Chris Paul and T.J. Ford, and had his jersey number (#25) retired along with Ben Wilson.

College career

Rose accepted a scholarship to play for the University of Memphis Tigers under John Calipari, who recruited him after seeing him play in an AAU game. Strong efforts were made by Indiana University and in-state University of Illinois to sign Rose to their own programs. Illinois in particular planned to pair Rose and their five-star recruit Eric Gordon, who had played AAU basketball with Rose. Gordon, however, retracted his verbal commitment from the Fighting Illini, opting to play for Indiana, and Rose subsequently gave his verbal commitment before the start of his senior season. Rose chose Memphis because of the school's history of putting players in the NBA and the prospect of Rod Strickland, a 17-year veteran of the league, mentoring him. Rose switched to #23, due to the fact that #25 had been retired by the school in honor of Penny Hardaway.

With the addition of Rose and led by veteran upperclassmen Joey Dorsey and Chris Douglas-Roberts, the Tigers started out the season ranked third in the nation. Memphis sprinted to a 26–0 start and claimed the number one ranking in the country for the first time in over 25 years before falling to the University of Tennessee Volunteers 66–62 in February. Memphis was able to bounce back and capture the Conference USA tournament to qualify for the "Big Dance" with a 33–1 record. Rose averaged 14.9 points per game, 4.7 assists and 4.5 rebounds per game during the regular season and earned All-American Third Team honors among others. He finished as a finalist for the Bob Cousy Award as well as the John R. Wooden Award.

Memphis was seeded No. 1 in the South Region. Rose earned high praise for his increased focus on defense, hounding Texas Longhorn guard D. J. Augustin into a low-percentage game in the Elite Eight. In a match-up against UCLA in the Final Four, Rose finished with 25 points and 9 rebounds to lead the Tigers to an 85–67 win and a trip to the NCAA championship game against the Kansas Jayhawks. The win set an NCAA mark for most wins in a season (38). Against Kansas, Rose scored 17 points on 7–of–17 shooting, along with six rebounds and seven assists, but missed a critical free throw at the end of the second half as Memphis fell in overtime, 75–68. Memphis concluded the season 38–2. Rose was named to the All-Final Four team after averaging 20.8 points, 6.5 rebounds and 6.0 assists per game.

On April 15, Rose announced he would forgo his final three seasons at Memphis and declared for the 2008 NBA draft.

Grading controversy
According to Sheri Lipman of the University of Memphis legal counsel, a month after the loss to Kansas, the NCAA sent a letter to the school stating that Rose had "an invalidated standardized test score the previous year at Chicago's Simeon High School." The next January, the NCAA sent another letter, charging Memphis with knowing that Rose had someone else take his SAT for him. Memphis started its own investigation and sent its response back on April 24.

On May 28, 2009, the Memphis Commercial Appeal obtained the letter through the Freedom of Information Act and released it. Although the player's name was redacted due to privacy laws, process of elimination, and sources revealed the player as Derrick Rose. The next day, in a separate investigation, James Sullivan, Inspector General of the Chicago Public Schools district's Board of Education, released a report of his investigation stating that four student-athletes of a CPS school had one-month grade boosts to alter their college transcripts. The Chicago Sun-Times revealed the school as Simeon Career Academy and that three of the four were Rose and his former teammates Kevin Johnson and Tim Flowers, prominent members of the back-to-back championship teams. The newspaper claimed that Rose's grade was changed from a D to a C. Another part of the report stated that "high school staff lost the original permanent records for three of the above mentioned students athletes" (including the unknown four). Sullivan started the investigation because "none of the grade changes were supported by any documentation." He also failed to find a suspect as "at least seven people at Simeon had the ability to access student grades and records." Illinois High School Association (IHSA) executive director Marty Hickman reacted by saying, "It is obvious that this is worth taking a look into." Robert Smith, who coached the Wolverines from 2004 to 2007, denied any wrongdoing. District spokeswoman Monique Bond said the students involved probably did not know about the grade change.

Allegations surfaced that Rose's brother, Reggie, had been allowed to travel with the team for free on several occasions.

Memphis contended that it had learned of the allegations about Rose's SAT score shortly after he enrolled at the school. It conducted its own investigation, in which Rose was questioned by four school officials. Ultimately, Memphis was unable to find any evidence that Rose had cheated based on what was available at the time and cleared him to play.

Rose released a statement through his lawyer Daniel E. Reidy: "Mr. Rose is aware of the allegations reported in the press. Mr. Rose cooperated fully with the University of Memphis' athletic and legal departments’ investigation of this issue when he was a student, and that investigation uncovered no wrongdoing on his part."

On August 20, 2009, the NCAA vacated Memphis' 2007–08 season. It took the position that because the Educational Testing Service voided Rose's SAT score after Rose's freshman year at Memphis, strict liability required that Rose be retroactively declared ineligible. It also determined that even without the questions about his test score, Rose would have lost his eligibility in December 2007 due to Reggie Rose being allowed to travel for free.

On May 28, 2010, Rose, former Memphis basketball coach John Calipari, and Memphis athletic director R.C. Johnson reached a $100,000 out-of-court settlement with three attorneys who represented Memphis season ticket holders and threatened a lawsuit over the vacated 2007–08 season. The Memphis Commercial Appeal first reported on this settlement in October 2011.

Professional career

Chicago Bulls (2008–2016)

2008–09 season: Rookie of the Year

Rose was selected with the first overall pick in the 2008 draft by the Chicago Bulls. He was selected to the U.S. Select Team to scrimmage against and prepare the National Team for the Olympics in Beijing. In mid-July, he played two games in the Orlando Pro Summer League until forced out by tendinitis in his right knee, ending his summer, but returned in October to play all eight preseason games.

Rose became the first Bulls draftee to score 10 points or more in his first 10 games since Michael Jordan, and earned Eastern Conference Rookie of the Month honors for November and December. During the All-Star Weekend, Rose played in the Rookie Challenge, and won the Skills Challenge, where he beat out several All-Stars to become the first rookie to claim the trophy. Overcoming a January and February slump, Rose returned to form and won monthly rookie honors in March. Meanwhile, the Bulls, re-energized by the trade deadline acquisitions of John Salmons and Brad Miller, finished the regular season on a 12–4 spurt to qualify as the seventh seed in the Eastern Conference. Rose won Rookie of the Year, joining Jordan (1985) and Elton Brand (2000) as the only Bulls to do so. He was also the first number-one draft pick since LeBron James to win the award. He averaged 16.8 points on 47.5% field goal shooting, 6.3 assists (leading all rookies) and 3.9 rebounds per game and was also named to the NBA All-Rookie First Team.

In his playoff debut against the defending champion Boston Celtics, Rose recorded 36 points (tying Kareem Abdul-Jabbar's NBA record for points scored by a rookie in his playoff debut, set in 1970), 11 assists, and 4 rebounds as the Bulls prevailed in a 105–103 overtime win on the road. Rose became the second player in NBA history to record 35 points and 10 assists in his playoff debut, after Chris Paul. Rose averaged 19.7 points on 47.5% shooting, 6.3 assists and 4.9 rebounds per game in his first playoff series, as the Bulls were defeated by the Celtics in seven games.

2009–10 season: First All-Star selection
Rose's sophomore season started off with an ankle injury in his first preseason game. Rose would go on to miss the rest of the preseason. Rose started the Bulls' season opener against the San Antonio Spurs but played limited minutes. Rose's ankle bothered him for most of November, but as his ankle healed, his game improved. On January 28, 2010, Rose was elected to his first career All-Star Game as a reserve for the Eastern Conference, making him the first Bulls player to be selected since Michael Jordan in 1998. Rose ended up with eight points, four assists and three steals in the game. On April 13, 2010, Rose scored 39 points against the Celtics, making 15–22 field goals and 9–10 free throws. The Bulls once again made the playoffs in the 2009–10 season, finishing with a 41–41 record. In the playoffs Rose averaged 26.8 points and 7.2 assists, but the Bulls lost in five games to the Cleveland Cavaliers.

2010–11 season: MVP season 

On October 30, 2010, in the Bulls' second game of the season, Rose scored 39 points in a 101–91 win against the Detroit Pistons. Two days after, Rose contributed 13 assists, helping Luol Deng score a career high 40 points in a win against the Portland Trail Blazers. On December 10, Rose scored 29 points and had 9 assists, leading the Bulls to their first victory over the Los Angeles Lakers since December 19, 2006.

On January 17, 2011, Rose recorded his first career triple-double with 22 points, 10 rebounds and 12 assists in a 96–84 win over the Memphis Grizzlies. On January 27, he was announced as a starting guard on the 2011 NBA All-Star Team for the East squad.

On February 17, in the Bulls' last game before the All-Star break, Rose set a career-high with 42 points, while also recording 8 assists and 5 rebounds, as the Bulls beat the San Antonio Spurs 109–99. On March 26, Rose had a career high 17 assists, along with 30 points, in a 95–87 victory over the Milwaukee Bucks.

At the end of the 2010–11 NBA season the Bulls finished with a league leading record of 62–20. Their 60+ wins was the Bulls' first such season since 1997–98 and sixth 60+ win in franchise history. At season's end, Rose became only the third player since the 1972–73 NBA season to record 2,000 points and 600 assists in a single season. The other two players were LeBron James and Michael Jordan.

On May 3, Rose was named the NBA Most Valuable Player, joining Jordan as the only players to receive the award in Chicago Bulls history. At 22 years and 6 months old, Rose also became the youngest player to receive the award (Wes Unseld, formerly the youngest MVP, won the award in 1968–69 at age 23 years, 2 months).

In the 2011 NBA playoffs, the Bulls defeated the Indiana Pacers and Atlanta Hawks in the first two rounds. In the Eastern Conference Finals, the Bulls faced the Miami Heat, led by James, Dwyane Wade and Chris Bosh. The Bulls lost the series in five games. During the 2011 playoffs, Rose averaged 27.1 points per game, but only shot 39% from the field and 24% for three-pointers.

2011–12 season: ACL tear
In December 2011, Rose signed a five-year contract extension with the Bulls for $94.8 million. The contract was 30 percent of the Bulls' salary cap, the maximum allowed under a rule dubbed the "Derrick Rose Rule" from the 2011 NBA Collective Bargaining Agreement.

Rose was voted as an All-Star Game starter for the second consecutive year. He was the second leading vote getter behind Orlando Magic center Dwight Howard. He averaged 21.8 ppg, along with a career high 7.9 apg in 35.3 mpg, but played a career low 39 games due to injuries. He helped Luol Deng become an All-Star for the first time in his career.

During Game 1 of the first round of the playoffs against the Philadelphia 76ers, Rose injured his left knee while trying to jump. He was immediately helped off the court. The injury occurred when the Bulls were leading by 12 points with 1:22 left to play. Rose came up just short of a triple-double, finishing with 23 points, 9 assists, and 9 rebounds in 37 minutes of action. An MRI later revealed that Rose tore the ACL in his left knee and would miss the rest of the playoffs. Rose had surgery performed on May 12, 2012, with an estimated recovery period of 8–12 months.

2012–13 season: Year absence
Rose returned to full contact practice in January 2013, and was cleared by doctor to play that March, but he did not appear in a game during the 2012–13 NBA season. Despite Rose's absence, the Bulls advanced to the Eastern Conference Semifinals, where they lost to the eventual champions, the Miami Heat.

2013–14 season: Return and torn meniscus
Rose's much awaited return came on October 5, 2013, in a pre-season game against the Indiana Pacers. He had a slow start but scored his first point in the first quarter. He finished the game with 13 points in 20 minutes of play. On October 16, 2013, Rose returned to play in Chicago for the first time, scoring 22 points against the Detroit Pistons. "I think I'm way more explosive now. Like getting to the rim. I think I can take contact a little bit better. And as far as jumping-wise, I think I can jump even higher. They tested my vertical -- I increased it by 5 inches", Rose said after the win. During the pre-season, Rose averaged 20.7 points and 5 assists.

His first official game was in 107–95 loss against the defending champions Miami Heat on October 29. Rose was limited to 12 points, while having 4 assists in 34 minutes of play. He played his usual minutes, but was inefficient from the field, shooting 4–15. Two days later, he played his first official home game against the New York Knicks where he hit the game-winning floater in an 82–81 win. He had 18 points, 6 rebounds and 3 assists. On November 3, 2013, Rose scored 13 points and committed 8 turnovers in the loss against the Philadelphia 76ers. He struggled in his return, shooting 28.8% from the field and averaging 5.7 turnovers in his first three games.

On November 22, Rose injured his right knee during a game against the Portland Trail Blazers. An MRI the next day confirmed that Rose tore his right knee meniscus and that surgery was required. At the time, Rose was averaging 15.9 points and 4.3 assists in 31.1 minutes per game. On November 25, Rose underwent surgery on the torn meniscus in his right knee. The same day, the Bulls announced Rose was out for the season, after a successful surgery.

2014–15 season: Back to the playoffs

Rose returned from injury to play in the Bulls' season opener against the New York Knicks on October 29, 2014 and recorded 13 points and 5 assists in 21 minutes of action. He went on to score a season-high 32 points on January 14 against the Washington Wizards, before being ruled out again with another knee injury a month later. He appeared in 51 games, the most he'd played since the 2010–11 season.

On February 24, it was announced Rose required another round of surgery on his right knee and was ruled out indefinitely. An exam and subsequent MRI confirmed a medial meniscus tear of the right knee, the same injury he sustained on November 22, 2013 against the Portland Trail Blazers. On February 27, he was deemed a possibility of returning toward the end of the season after he underwent successful surgery and was ruled out for just four to six weeks.

Rose returned to action on April 8 after a 20-game absence, and working on a minutes restriction, he was 3-of-9 from the field and finished with nine points in 19 minutes as the Bulls lost to the Orlando Magic.

On April 18, Rose played in his first playoff game since Game 1 of the 2012 playoffs (the game where he tore his left ACL). Rose finished with 23 points and 7 assists on 9-of-16 shooting. During the Bulls' first round series against the Bucks, Rose averaged 21.5 points per game. On May 8, Rose banked in a three-pointer at the buzzer and scored 30 points to give the Bulls a 99-96 victory over the Cleveland Cavaliers and a 2-1 lead in the Eastern Conference semi-finals. However, the Cavaliers won the final three games to take the series in six games.

2015–16 season: Final season with the Bulls
A preseason left orbital bone fracture saw Rose begin the regular season wearing a face mask. On November 5, 2015, Rose scored a then season-high 29 points on 12-of-25 shooting in a 104–98 win over the Oklahoma City Thunder. He showed signs of his old MVP self as he scored 10 points over the final three and a half minutes to lift the Bulls after they blew a 10-point lead in the fourth quarter. On December 18, he scored a season-high 34 points in a 147–144 quadruple overtime loss to the Detroit Pistons. On February 5, 2016, he had a season-best game with 30 points, 9 rebounds and 8 assists in a 115–110 loss to the Denver Nuggets.

New York Knicks (2016–2017)

On June 22, 2016, Rose was traded, along with Justin Holiday and a 2017 second-round draft pick, to the New York Knicks in exchange for future teammate José Calderón, Jerian Grant and Robin Lopez. He made his debut for the Knicks in the team's season opener on October 25 against the Cleveland Cavaliers. In 29 minutes of action, he scored 17 points on 7-of-17 shooting in a 117–88 loss. On November 4, Rose returned to Chicago for the first time as a member of the Knicks, recording 15 points and 11 assists in a 117–104 win over the Bulls. On November 17, he scored a season-high 27 points in a 119–112 loss to the Washington Wizards. He topped that mark on November 28, scoring 30 points in a 112–103 loss to the Oklahoma City Thunder. On January 10, 2017, Rose was fined an undisclosed amount after he reportedly flew to Chicago to be with his mother but did not notify team officials ahead of their game against the New Orleans Pelicans on January 9. Eight days later, he matched his season high with 30 points in a 117–106 win over the Boston Celtics. On April 2, 2017, he was ruled out for the rest of the season after tearing the meniscus in his left knee, necessitating a fourth round of knee surgery for Rose in his nine-year career.

Cleveland Cavaliers (2017–2018)

On July 25, 2017, Rose signed with the Cleveland Cavaliers. In his debut for the Cavaliers in their season opener against the Boston Celtics on October 17, 2017, Rose scored 14 points in a 102–99 win. On November 24, 2017, Rose left the team to re-evaluate his future in the NBA. His increasing frustration with injuries caused him to question his desire to continue playing. He returned to working with the Cavaliers' medical staff in early December in hopes of recovering from a sprained left ankle and bone spurs. On January 18, 2018, Rose returned to the line-up after missing more than two months with ankle injuries and scored nine points in 13 minutes in a 104–103 win over the Orlando Magic.

Minnesota Timberwolves (2018–2019)
On February 8, 2018, Rose was acquired by the Utah Jazz in a three-team trade that also involved the Cavaliers and the Sacramento Kings. Two days later, he was waived by the Jazz.

On March 8, 2018, Rose signed with the Minnesota Timberwolves, reuniting him with Tom Thibodeau, Jimmy Butler and Taj Gibson. In the playoffs, Rose averaged 14.2 points in 23.8 minutes per game, as the Timberwolves lost 4–1 to the Houston Rockets in the first round.

On July 4, 2018, Rose re-signed with the Timberwolves for the 2018–19 season. On October 31, in his first start of the season, Rose scored a career-high 50 points in a 128–125 win over the Utah Jazz, securing the victory with a block on Utah's final shot as time expired. On December 26, he had 24 points and eight assists and received MVP chants in a 119–94 win over the Bulls in Chicago. It was just his second career game in the United Center against his former team. On January 15 against the Philadelphia 76ers, Rose reached 10,000 career points. On January 20, he scored 29 of his 31 points in the second half and hit an 18-footer with 0.6 seconds left to give the Timberwolves a 116–114 victory over the Phoenix Suns. Right ankle trouble saw Rose miss 11 of 19 games spanning late December to late January. He missed an additional three games in early February. On March 21, he was ruled out for the rest of the season with a right elbow injury.

Detroit Pistons (2019–2021)
On July 7, 2019, Rose signed with the Detroit Pistons. On October 23, he made his debut for the Pistons, logging 18 points, three rebounds, and nine assists in a 119–110 win over the Indiana Pacers.

He became the first player in Pistons history to record seven consecutive 20+ point games as a reserve, which also coincided with his career-high 14-game streak of scoring 20 points or more. The streak ended after he suffered a groin injury during a game with the Denver Nuggets. In his third game after returning from injury, Rose scored a season-high 31 points en route to a win against the Phoenix Suns.

Return to New York (2021–present)
On February 8, 2021, Rose was traded back to the New York Knicks for Dennis Smith Jr. and a 2021 second-round draft pick, once again reuniting him with coach Tom Thibodeau and former teammate Taj Gibson. Rose was a major contributor coming from the bench, helping the Knicks finish fourth in the East and placing third in the Sixth Man of the Year voting. On May 28, during Game 3 of the Knicks' first round series against the Atlanta Hawks, Rose made his first playoff start since the 2015 conference semifinals, recording a season-high 30 points, as well as six rebounds and five assists, in a 105–94 loss as Atlanta took a 2–1 series lead. The Hawks would win the series 4–1.

On August 18, 2021, the Knicks extended Rose's contract by three years with a $43 million deal. On December 17, in a 116–103 win over the Houston Rockets, Rose suffered a right ankle injury. Five days later, he underwent surgery on his right ankle and was ruled out for at least two months. On February 25, 2022, Rose underwent another procedure to address a skin infection on his ankle and was ruled out indefinitely.

National team career
Rose was a member of the United States men's national basketball teams that won gold medals at the 2010 and 2014 FIBA World Cup.

Player profile
He's averaged 18.2 points per game for his career. He has never been a knock-down shooter from the arc, shooting 30 percent for his career. He developed into a bank-shot shooter during the 2015–16 season after struggling with his jump shot due to what he attributes to depth perception issues following eye surgery in 2015.

In Rose's prime in Chicago, he was widely considered to be one of the most athletic point guards in NBA history before a string of knee injuries slowed him down. A combination of explosiveness, leaping ability and speed allowed him to attack the basket frequently and he was also an effective passer. Rose clocked in a maximum vertical jump of 40 inches during the 2008 NBA Combine.

Career statistics

NBA

Regular season

|-
| style="text-align:left;"|
| style="text-align:left;"|Chicago
| 81 || 80 || 37.0 || .475 || .222 || .788 || 3.9 || 6.3 || .8 || .2 || 16.8
|-
| style="text-align:left;"|
| style="text-align:left;"|Chicago
| 78 || 78 || 36.8 || .489 || .267 || .766 || 3.8 || 6.0 || .7 || .3 || 20.8
|-
| style="text-align:left;"|
| style="text-align:left;"|Chicago
| 81 || 81 || 37.4 || .445 || .332|| .858 || 4.1 || 7.7 || 1.0 || .6 || 25.0
|-
| style="text-align:left;"|
| style="text-align:left;"|Chicago
| 39 || 39 || 35.3 || .435 || .312 || .812 || 3.4 || 7.9 || .9 || .7 || 21.8
|- 
| style="text-align:left;"|
| style="text-align:left;"|Chicago
| 10 || 10 || 31.1 || .354 || .340 || .844 || 3.2 || 4.3 || .5 || .1 || 15.9
|- 
| style="text-align:left;"|
| style="text-align:left;"|Chicago
| 51 || 51 || 30.0 || .405 || .280 || .813 || 3.2 || 4.9 || .7 || .3 || 17.7
|- 
| style="text-align:left;"|
| style="text-align:left;"|Chicago
| 66 || 66 || 31.8 || .427 || .293 || .793 || 3.4 || 4.7 || .7 || .2 || 16.4
|- 
| style="text-align:left;"|
| style="text-align:left;"|New York
| 64 || 64 || 32.5 || .471 || .217 || .874 || 3.8 || 4.4 || .7 || .3 || 18.0
|- 
| style="text-align:left;"|
| style="text-align:left;"|Cleveland
| 16 || 7 || 19.3 || .439 || .250 || .854 || 1.8 || 1.6 || .2 || .3 || 9.8
|- 
| style="text-align:left;"|
| style="text-align:left;"|Minnesota
| 9 || 0 || 12.4 || .426 || .167 || 1.000 || .7 || 1.2 || .4 || .0 || 5.8
|- 
| style="text-align:left;"|
| style="text-align:left;"|Minnesota
| 51 || 13 || 27.3 || .482 || .370 || .856 || 2.7 || 4.3 || .6 || .2 || 18.0
|- 
| style="text-align:left;"|
| style="text-align:left;"|Detroit
| 50 || 15 || 26.0 || .490 || .306 || .871 || 2.4 || 5.6 || .8 || .3 || 18.1
|-
| style="text-align:left;"|
| style="text-align:left;"|Detroit
| 15 || 0 || 22.8 || .429 || .333 || .840 || 1.9 || 4.2 || 1.2 || .3 || 14.2
|-
| style="text-align:left;"|
| style="text-align:left;"|New York
| 35 || 3 || 26.8 || .487 || .411 || .883 || 2.5 || 4.2 || .9 || .4 || 14.9
|-
| style="text-align:left;"|
| style="text-align:left;"|New York
| 26 || 4 || 24.5 || .445 || .402 || .968 || 3.0 || 4.0 || .8 || .5 || 12.0
|- class="sortbottom"
| style="text-align:center;" colspan="2"|Career
| 672 || 511 || 31.7 || .457 || .316 || .830 || 3.3 || 5.4 || .8 || .3 || 18.2
|- class="sortbottom"
| style="text-align:center;" colspan="2"|All-Star
| 3 || 2 || 21.0 || .517 || .667 || .500 || 1.3 || 4.0 || 1.3 || .0 || 11.0

Playoffs

|-
| style="text-align:left;"|2009
| style="text-align:left;"|Chicago
| 7 || 7 || 44.7 || .492 || .000 || .800 || 6.3 || 6.4 || .6 || .7 || 19.7
|-
| style="text-align:left;"|2010
| style="text-align:left;"|Chicago
| 5 || 5 || 42.4 || .456 || .333 || .818 || 3.4 || 7.2 || .8 || .0 || 26.8
|-
| style="text-align:left;"|2011
| style="text-align:left;"|Chicago
| 16 || 16 || 40.6 || .396 || .248 || .828 || 4.3 || 7.7 || 1.4 || .7 || 27.1
|-
| style="text-align:left;"|2012
| style="text-align:left;"|Chicago
| 1 || 1 || 37.0 || .391 || .500 || 1.000 || 9.0 || 9.0 || 1.0 || 1.0 || 23.0
|-
| style="text-align:left;"|2015
| style="text-align:left;"|Chicago
| 12 || 12 || 37.8 || .396 || .348 || .897 || 4.8 || 6.5 || 1.2 || .5 || 20.3
|-
| style="text-align:left;"|2018
| style="text-align:left;"|Minnesota
| 5 || 0 || 23.8 || .509 || .700 || .857 || 1.8 || 2.6 || .4 || .0 || 14.2
|-
| style="text-align:left;"|2021
| style="text-align:left;"|New York
| 5 || 3 || 35.0 || .476 || .471 || 1.000 || 4.0 || 5.0 || .4 || .2 || 19.4
|- class="sortbottom"
| style="text-align:center;" colspan="2"|Career
| 51 || 44 || 38.4 || .427 || .324 || .845 || 4.4 || 6.5 || 1.0 || .5 || 22.4

College

|-
| style="text-align:left;"|2007–08
| style="text-align:left;"|Memphis
| 40 || 40 || 29.2 || .477 || .337 || .712 || 4.5 || 4.7 || 1.2 || .4 || 14.9

Awards and accomplishments

NBA
 NBA Most Valuable Player: 2011
 NBA All-Star Selection: 2010, 2011, 2012
 All-NBA First Team: 2011
 NBA Rookie of the Year: 2009
 NBA All-Rookie First Team: 2009
 Skills Challenge Champion: 2009
 Conference Rookie of the Month: November, December, March
 Conference Player of the Month: April 2010, March 2011

College
Freshman year (2007–08)
 NCAA Tournament All-Final Four Team
 NCAA Tournament South Region MVP
 NABC 3rd Team All-American
NABC All-District 7 First Team
All-Conference USA First Team
 Conference USA Freshman of the Year
Conference USA All Freshman Team 1st Team
Sporting News All-Freshman Team
Conference USA Player of the Week for games between December 17 through the 23rd
 2K Sports College Hoops Classic MVP
2K Sports College Hoops Classic All-Tournament Team

High school
Senior year (2006–07)
Class AA State Championship
Class AA Tournament MVP
 Illinois Mr. Basketball 2007
2007 McDonald's All-American
USA Today 2007 All-USA First Team
2007 First-team Parade All-American
EA Sports 2007 All-American First Team
All State Illinois 2007
MaxPreps.com All-America First Team
Slam Magazine 2007 First Team
MidStateHoops.com 2007 Class AA Player of the Year
Junior year (2005–06)
Class AA State Championship
Class AA Tournament MVP
2006 Parade All-American Fourth Team
All State Illinois 2006
EA Sports 2006 All-American Second Team
Sophomore year (2004–05)
2005 Parade All-American Third Team
Chicago Sun-Times All-Area

Personal life
On October 9, 2012, Rose's girlfriend, Mieka Reese, gave birth to their son.

Rose's agent is former Bulls guard B. J. Armstrong.

Rose is a Christian and has spoken about his faith, saying "God does everything for a reason". He wears a wristband that says "In Jesus' Name I Play" and has several tattoos about his faith.

In 2016, Rose was involved in a federal civil lawsuit to assess whether he and two friends raped an unnamed former girlfriend in August 2013. In the months before the alleged gang-rape, Rose's accuser, referred to as "Jane Doe" in court transcripts, testified that Rose made her uncomfortable by asking her to perform sexual acts for him or to involve other people in their sex life; he would sometimes get angry when she refused. Doe also mentioned that on the day of the incident, she was drugged against her consent, and alternated in and out of consciousness. During the trial, Rose expressed difficulty and uncertainty with the definition of the word "consent". In October 2016, he was found not liable by an eight-member jury. An appeal in 2018 was denied.

In 2018, Rose introduced The Rose Scholars, a scholarship program to help students achieve a higher education.

Endorsements
Rose was the cover athlete of NBA 2K13 alongside fellow NBA players Kevin Durant and Blake Griffin.

Rose was the lone cover athlete for the 2K Sports Downloadable Content game, NBA 2K10 Draft Combine, which was released on Xbox Live Arcade for the Xbox 360 and PlayStation Network for the PlayStation 3.

Rose is a part-owner and spokesman for the Chicago-based Giordano's Pizzeria.

In 2008, Rose signed a shoe deal with Adidas for $1 million per year. He has also signed with Wilson Sporting Goods. Other endorsement deals include Skullcandy headphones, Powerade, Force Factor sports drinks and a suburban Chicago Nissan dealership. In May 2018, it was announced that the Adidas D Rose 9's would be released in July 2018.

In 2011, Rose was estimated by Crain's Chicago Business to earn $1.5–$2.5 million annually in endorsements, ranking just outside the top 10 NBA players in that category. In 2012, it was reported that Rose signed a contract extension with Adidas, worth $185 million over 14 years.

See also

 2006 high school boys basketball All-Americans

References

External links

 
 Memphis Tigers bio

1988 births
Living people
2010 FIBA World Championship players
2014 FIBA Basketball World Cup players
African-American basketball players
All-American college men's basketball players
American men's basketball players
Basketball players from Chicago
Chicago Bulls draft picks
Chicago Bulls players
Cleveland Cavaliers players
Detroit Pistons players
College basketball controversies in the United States
FIBA Basketball World Cup-winning players
FIBA World Championship-winning players
McDonald's High School All-Americans
Memphis Tigers men's basketball players
Minnesota Timberwolves players
National Basketball Association All-Stars
New York Knicks players
Parade High School All-Americans (boys' basketball)
Point guards
United States men's national basketball team players
21st-century African-American sportspeople
20th-century African-American people